The Episcopal Conference of Thailand is composed of 2 ecclesiastical provinces, each headed by an archbishop, and 9 suffragan dioceses.

Episcopal Conference of Thailand

Ecclesiastical Province of Bangkok
Archdiocese of Bangkok 
Diocese of Chanthaburi 
Diocese of Chiang Mai
Diocese of Chiang Rai
Diocese of Nakhon Sawan 
Diocese of Ratchaburi
Diocese of Surat Thani

Ecclesiastical Province of Thare and Nonseng
Archdiocese of Thare and Nonseng 
Diocese of Nakhon Ratchasima
Diocese of Ubon Ratchathani
Diocese of Udon Thani

See also
Christianity in Thailand
Roman Catholicism in Thailand
List of Roman Catholic dioceses (structured_view)-Episcopal Conference of Thailand

External links 
Catholic-Hierarchy entry 
GCatholic.org.

Thailand
Catholic dioceses